Modern Vampires (also known as Revenant) is a 1998 American black comedy-horror film written by Matthew Bright, directed by Richard Elfman and starring Casper Van Dien, Natasha Gregson Wagner, Kim Cattrall, Natasha Lyonne, Udo Kier and Rod Steiger. It was released direct to video on October 19, 1999.

Plot

Dallas, a vampire, continuously bites people without permission from The Count. He is especially infuriated after Dallas turns Nico, a young woman and serial killer known as the "Hollywood Slasher" and orders her immediate death. 20 years after his exile, he returns to Los Angeles to pay a visit to his vampire friends: Ulrike, Vincent, Richard and Richard's pregnant wife Panthia. To celebrate Dallas' return, the five decide to spend the night clubbing in one of The Count's many vampire bars. Unfortunately, The Count is also there and he threatens Dallas to leave town.

Dr. Van Helsing, leader of Van Helsing's Institute of Vienna, is currently after the band of vampires. However, realizing that he is too old to handle the extermination alone, puts an ad in the newspaper for help. He gets Crips member Time Bomb, who does not believe in vampires but is willing to put a stake through anyone's heart for money. The pair succeed in subduing and killing Vincent. Van Helsing tells Time Bomb that 20 years ago, his son Hans was good friends with Dallas, who promised to save his life from a fatal genetic disorder by turning him into a vampire. After discovering this, Helsing killed Hans and his wife committed suicide out of grief, vowing to destroy Dallas for what he did to his son.

Dallas, having grown protective of Nico, drives around looking for her. After sharing a bit of each other's blood, Dallas reveals who he is and explains that the vampire community is out to get her, fearing her recklessness with expose the existence of vampires. After an attack by Van Hellsing and Time Bomb, Dallas takes Nico live with Richard and Panthia, who clean her up and take her shopping for some new clothes. Panthia develops a mother-like complex towards Nico and starts treating her like a daughter. While the four go out one night, Nico befriends a human woman named Rachel. Returning home they find  a hysterical Ulrike, who revealing Vincent's death to the others. Knowing that this was Van Helsing's handiwork, Dallas theorizes that he's closing in on them. Having concluded that even two vampire hunters will not be enough against the vampire infestation, Van Helsing and Time Bomb bring in three more Crips members - Soda Pop, L'il Monster, and Trigger.

Dallas then decides to take Nico to see her mother's house, as Nico has little memory of her human life. Nico has him kill her verbally and sexually abusive stepfather an exchanges heated words with her neglectful mother, who she claims never loved her. As they leave the trailer park, they are attacked by four of The Count's henchmen but manage to kill them. While driving back, Dallas reveals that he was ordered to kill Van Helsing, but chose not to after befriending Hans. He hoped that by curing Hans he could change his father's attitude towards the vampire community. This failed, leading to Van Helsing became vengeful towards Dallas and killed Hans without mercy. The Count then banished Dallas as punishment for not carrying out his order to kill him.

The next night, Nico gets a call from Rachel and invites Nico out to party. Meanwhile, Dallas pays a visit to The Count and begs him to spare Nico, but The Count once again threatens him to bring him Nico. With Nico and Dallas out, Van Helsing and his Crip employees storm the house and kill Richard and Panthia. They tie Ulrike to a bedpost, but she taunts the Crips into having sex with her before Van Helsing finally stakes her too. They are unaware that having sex with a vampire turns a person into a vampire. Suddenly, Nico returns, horrified at the carnage. She attacks Trigger and Rachel is accidentally shot with Nico shooting Trigger in retaliation. Time Bomb subdues Nico as Dallas returns home, coming face to face with Van Helsing. Dallas offers to lead Van Helsing to The Count if he releases Nico. Van Helsing reluctantly agrees as they all head for The Count's house.

Unfortunately, The Count's henchmen intercept them and take Nico and Van Helsing to The Count, where he hooks up Nico to a blood-draining machine and places Van Helsing in a box with only his head sticking out. Just as The Count is about to crack open Van Helsing's skull with a hammer, Dallas drives the van through the wall of the club. Dallas and the Crips, now vampires, come out and manage to kill The Count and his henchmen. Afterwards, Nico is set free and Rachel, in order to save her life, has been turned into a vampire. Nico, Rachel, and Dallas decide to move to New York. In the closing scene, a pajama-clad Van Helsing runs down an alley, screaming for forgiveness from his son. As he utters apologies to God and his son Hans, he screams for help, revealing vampire fangs in front of two police officers.

Production
Production began during late June 1997 in Los Angeles, under the working title of Revenant. A few months later, work on the film was complete.

Differences between R-rated and unrated versions
 The DVD version contains more explicit gore than the edited R-rated VHS release.
 In the Spanish DVD version by Manga Films, the title does not appear onscreen during the opening credits.

Reception
The movie has received third place Best International Film award at the Fant-Asia Film Festival in 1997.

See also
 Vampire film

References

External links
 

1998 films
1990s comedy horror films
American comedy horror films
Crips
1998 horror films
American vampire films
Films set in Los Angeles
Films directed by Richard Elfman
Films with screenplays by Matthew Bright
Films scored by Michael Wandmacher
Films scored by Danny Elfman
1998 comedy films
1990s English-language films
1990s American films